Lloyd Peck is a British physiologist who is a scientist with the British Antarctic Survey and affiliated with the Wolfson College, Cambridge. He is known for his research into biological adaptations of animals to extreme cold, in particular sea spiders.

He presented the 2004 Royal Institution Christmas Lectures on surviving in the Antarctic.

References

External links
Cambridge profile
BAS profile

Living people
Alumni of Jesus College, Cambridge
People educated at Queen Mary's Grammar School
British physiologists
British Antarctic Survey
Fellows of Wolfson College, Cambridge
Alumni of the University of Portsmouth
British oceanographers
British marine biologists
Year of birth missing (living people)